Padesh Ridge (‘Hrebet Padesh’ \'hre-bet 'pa-desh\) is the rocky ridge extending 12.7 km in east–west direction, 2.2 km wide, and rising to 1009 m in eastern Aristotle Mountains on Oscar II Coast in Graham Land.  It surmounts Rachel Glacier to the north and Starbuck Glacier to the south.  The feature is named after the settlement of Padesh in Southwestern Bulgaria.

Location
British mapping in 1976.

Maps
 British Antarctic Territory.  Scale 1:200000 topographic map.  DOS 610 Series, Sheet W 65 62.  Directorate of Overseas Surveys, Tolworth, UK, 1976.
 Antarctic Digital Database (ADD). Scale 1:250000 topographic map of Antarctica. Scientific Committee on Antarctic Research (SCAR). Since 1993, regularly upgraded and updated.

Notes

References
 Padesh Ridge. SCAR Composite Antarctic Gazetteer.
 Bulgarian Antarctic Gazetteer. Antarctic Place-names Commission. (details in Bulgarian, basic data in English)

External links
 Padesh Ridge. Copernix satellite image

Ridges of Graham Land
Oscar II Coast
Bulgaria and the Antarctic